Sultan Ahmad (سلطان احمد جلایر) was the ruler of the Jalayirid Sultanate (ruled 1382–1410), he was son to the most accomplished ruler of the sultanate, Shaykh Uways Jalayir. Early in his reign, he was involved in conflicts with his brothers. He would later suffer from several defeats with Timur and eventually imprisoned by the Mamluks. After being set free, he attacked his old enemy, the Qara Qoyunlu but was later captured and executed 1410.

Sibling rivalries

Ahmad came to power as a result of a plot against his brother Shaikh Hussain Jalayir, who was captured and executed. Ahmad's other brothers, Shaikh Ali and Bayazid opposed him. Husain's former amir, Adil Aqa, had Bayazid proclaimed sultan in Soltaniyeh, while Shaikh Ali prepared to leave Baghdad and march to Tabriz. To secure his position, Ahmad requested the assistance of the Qara Qoyunlu (Black Sheep Turkmen) which defeated Shaikh Ali and within two years Ahmad was able to neutralize his other brother, Bayazid.

Conflicts with Timur

In the spring of 1384, Timur and the Chagatai army (whom he was allied with) attacked the Jalayirids. Although Sultan Ahmad was not captured, his subordinates in Soltaniyeh failed to defend the town and Timur took it with little resistance. Timur gave the town to Adil Aqa, who had defected to him, before retiring from the campaign. Ahmad then sent an army to retake Soltaniyeh, but Adil Aqa successfully defended it.

In the midst of Timur's absence, Ahmad had to deal with an invasion by Tokhtamysh, Khan of the Golden Horde. Tokhtamysh's troops swept down into Azerbaijan, devastating the land, and Tabriz was sacked in 1385. Ahmad himself had escaped to Baghdad through the aid of his ally, Izz al-din Shir of Hakkari. The raid of Tabriz had significantly weakened Ahmad's position and so he could not combat Timur when he returned in 1386. Tabriz was taken by the Chagatai in the summer, its citizens had to pay a heavy tribute. Adil Aqa collected the tribute but was executed by Timur, who suspected him of corruption. Azerbaijan from this point on remained in the control of the Timurids, as Ahmad could not recover the province.

In 1393, Timur renewed the war with Ahmad. Near the end of August, he arrived in Baghdad, where Ahmad was residing. Deciding that defending the city was impossible, Ahmad fled and traveled to Mamluk-held Syria, and was granted asylum by Sultan Berkuk. Meanwhile, Baghdad was forced to pay ransom and many captives (including Ahmad's son Ala al-Daula) were taken with Timur when he left the city, most of the citizens were left unharmed. A member of the Sarbadar, Khwaja Mas'ud Sabzavari, was given control of the city.

In 1394, Ahmad returned to Baghdad and Khwaja Mas'ud withdrew his forces instead of fighting. As a result, Ahmad was able to regain control of the city for the next six years. He grew increasingly unpopular, however, and in 1397 or 1398 an unsuccessful conspiracy was hatched against him. Feeling unsafe in Baghdad, he left the city and requested the assistance of the Qara Qoyunlu under Qara Yusuf. The Turkmen arrived at the city, but Ahmad had a difficult time in preventing them from plundering Baghdad, and he eventually turned them back. In 1398 Timur's son and governor of Azerbaijan, Miran Shah, attempted to take Baghdad but Ahmad successfully resisted him. In 1399, an army from the Kingdom of Georgia raised the siege of the town of Alenjaq, which the Timurids had been attempting to take for over more than a decade. The leader of the Georgian army, one of Ahmad's sons, came to Baghdad, but rebelled and was killed.

Renewed conflicts 
When Timur returned from campaigns in the east in 1400, Ahmad feared that he would be attacked and left Baghdad. He returned for a short while but then left again, taking refuge with the Ottomans. In May 1401 a group of Chagatais sent to Baghdad by Timur encountered resistance. Although more Timurid troops were sent by the city commander, unaware that they were Timur's forces, they refused to give in. Timur himself soon arrived and Baghdad was subjected to a 40-day siege, when the city refused to surrender, Timur ordered the city to be stormed. Once it was taken, nearly all of the men, women and children were massacred and most of the public buildings were destroyed. The destruction was so widespread that Timur did not even bother to install a governor.

Soon afterwards, Ahmad returned to Baghdad and began to rebuild it. Although a contingent of the Chagatai army nearly captured him, he came back a few months later in 1402 with the Qara Qoyunlu ruler Qara Yusuf, who had also sought refuge with the Ottomans. Their friendship, however, did not last, and Qara Yusuf expelled Ahmad from the city. Ahmad fled to the Egyptian Mamluks a second time, who imprisoned him out of fear of Timur. In 1403, Qara Yusuf was driven out of Baghdad by the Timurids, and sought asylum with the Mamluks, who also imprisoned him. Reunited in prison, both Ahmad and Qara Yusuf renewed their friendship and struck an agreement with each other, whereby Ahmad would retain Iraq, and Qara Yusuf would take over Azerbaijan.

Overthrow
When Timur died in 1405, Nasir-ad-Din Faraj, the Mamluk Sultan of Egypt, released Ahmad. He returned to Baghdad, and Qara Yusuf took up residence in Tabriz. In spite of their agreement, however, it did not last. Ahmed wanted to regain Azerbaijan and, as a result he attacked the Qara Qoyunlu. He managed to occupy Tabriz briefly, but was defeated in August 1410 where he was captured by Qara Yusuf and executed. Ahmad's son Ala-ud-Daula, who had been released by the Timurids, was also killed. Ahmad's nephew Shah Walad Jalayir briefly succeeded him in Baghdad but the Qara Qoyunlu took the city a year later.

The Jalayirids were eventually pushed south into lower Iraq, ruling over the towns of Hillah, Wasit and Basra until defeated by the Qara Qoyunlu in 1432, bringing an end to the dynasty.

References

Peter Jackson (1986). The Cambridge History of Iran, Volume Six: The Timurid and Safavid Periods. 
Jalayerids. "Encyclopædia Iranica''. Center for Iranian Studies, Columbia University. June, 2004. Retrieved May 21, 2006.

Year of birth unknown
1410 deaths
Jalayirids
Date of birth unknown